Agriculture in Burkina Faso has tremendous potential.

Burkina Faso produced in 2018:

 1.9 million tons of sorghum;
 1.7 million tons of maize;
 1.1 million tons of millet;
 630 thousand tons of cowpea (3rd largest producer in the world, losing only to Niger and Nigeria);
 490 thousand tons of sugar cane;
 482 thousand tons of cotton;
 329 thousand tons of peanut;
 253 thousand tons of sesame seed (8th largest producer in the world);
 240 thousand tons of vegetable;
 160 thousand tons of rice;
 103 thousand tons of cashew nuts (12th largest producer in the world);

In addition to smaller productions of other agricultural products.

References